This is a list of all the ultra-prominent peaks (with topographic prominence greater than 1,500 metres) in Mainland Southeast Asia. All values below are given in metres.

Patkai-Chin Hills

Indo-Malayan System

Malay Peninsula

Annamite Range and eastern mountains

Sources
List Burma
List Southeast Asia
Map High Asia
Map Southeast Asia

Southeast Asia
Landforms of Southeast Asia